The 2022 Vaahteraliiga season was the 43rd season of the Vaahteraliiga, the highest level of American football in Finland. The regular season took place between May 15 and September 3, 2022. The Finnish Champion was determined in the playoffs, and at the championship game Vaahteramalja XLIII the Kuopio Steelers defeated the Seinäjoki Crocodiles. It was the Steelers' third straight championship title.

Standings

Playoffs

References

American football in Finland
Vaahteraliiga
Vaahteraliiga